is a large cubewano in the Kuiper belt that was discovered in July 2014 by the Pan-STARRS-1 telescope, and announced on 17 July 2016. It is one of the brighter trans-Neptunian objects, being the 34th brightest cubewano as of 23 July 2016. Its exact size is unknown, but is most likely between 240 and 730 kilometers across. Mike Brown's website lists it as a "possible" dwarf planet, with an estimated diameter of 337 kilometers.

 was observed by the New Horizons probe in September 2017 and August 2018. It passed close by: about 8.7 AU away on 1 January 2017, and 7.5 AU on 1 January 2019.

References

External links 
 

556416
556416
556416
20140728